Khachaturyan is an Armenian surname. Notable people with the surname include:
Andrey Khachaturyan (born 1987), Belarusian football midfielder of Armenian origin
Aram Khachaturyan (1903–1978), Soviet and Armenian composer and conductor
Artur Khachaturyan (born 1992), Armenian professional basketball player
Vahagn Khachaturyan (born 1959), Armenian politician

Armenian-language surnames
Surnames of Armenian origin